Cryptocephalus trimaculatus is a species of cylindrical leaf beetle belonging to the family Chrysomelidae, subfamily Cryptocephalinae.

Etymology
The Latin species name trimaculatusis composed by the prefix tri meaning "three" and by the suffix maculatus meaning "spotted".

Distribution
These beetles can be found in Central and Southern Europe and in the Near East.

Habitat
These beetles mainly  inhabit forest edges of various oaks (Quercus species) and hawthorn (Crataegus species).

Description
The body is oval shaped and shiny. The colour of head and pronotum is black, while elytra are orange-red, with three black spots on each elytron. There is a black spot in the front and two black spots in the back. These can be connected to each other in some subject. Abdomen and legs are black. Furthermore, the elytra are longitudinally covered of rows of small black dots. This species is rather similar to Lachnaia italica.

Biology
Adults can be found from March to May and from July to September.

References

External links
 
 
 Baza Biomap

trimaculatus
Beetles of Asia
Beetles of Europe
Beetles described in 1790
Taxa named by Pietro Rossi